This is a list of television broadcasters the Swiss Super League. 45 countries are broadcast the Swiss Super League. On The Website from sfl.ch is a list too with the television station they are broadcasters the Swiss Super League.

Switzerland

International broadcasters

Americas broadcasters

Asia broadcasters

Europe broadcasters

References

Swiss Super League
Swiss Super League
Association football on television
Sports television in Switzerland